Weeekly is a South Korean girl group under IST Entertainment (formerly Play M Entertainment). The group is Play M Entertainment's second girl group in 10 years, after Apink. The group consists of six members: Lee Soo-jin, Monday, Park So-eun, Lee Jae-hee, Jihan and Zoa. The group debuted on June 30, 2020, with their debut EP, We Are. Originally a septet, Shin Ji-yoon left the group on June 1, 2022.

Name
The group's name, Weeekly, taken from the role of the member in charge of each day of the week as the catchphrase says that "every day brings a new and special week".

History

Pre-debut
Soojin, Jiyoon and Soeun were contestants of YG Entertainment and JTBC's survival show Mix Nine, with Soojin being the "prominent face" among the female contestants during the initial stages of the show's launch. However, on January 8, 2018, Soojin withdrew from the show following injury from a traffic accident and had received emergency surgery.

In October 2018, Fave Entertainment had announced its plans to debut a new girl group, temporarily named Fave Girls (페이브 걸즈, stylised as FAVE GIRLS). The lineup included Soojin, Jiyoon, Monday, Soeun and Jaehee. The group was subsequently named PlayM Girls (플레이엠 걸즈) following the merger of Plan A Entertainment and Fave Entertainment, to form Play M Entertainment, on April 1, 2019.

2020: Debut with We Are and We Can
On May 8, 2020, Play M Entertainment announced that PlayM Girls were confirmed to make their debut in June. On May 11, the group name was revealed to be Weeekly, with all seven members of the group and their profile pictures revealed. On June 12, the group's debut extended play We Are was announced to be released on June 30, together with a release schedule.

On June 30, the music video for the EP's lead single "Tag Me (@Me)" was released 18 hours before the release of the EP. Subsequently, We Are was released digitally, with Jiyoon involved in writing and composing two songs of the EP. The group had a press showcase on the same day. Originally, the group would also have a live debut showcase through V Live, but a fire that broke out near the venue of the showcase resulted in its cancelation. The music video for "Tag Me (@Me)" went on to achieve 10 million views in its first 7 days, while the EP sold over 10,000 copies within its first 8 days.

The group sang KakaoTV variety show Wannabe Ryan's signal song "Boom Chi Ki" (붐 치키). The single was digitally released on September 25. On September 28, the Korean Consumer Forum awarded Weeekly the "Female Rookie of the Year Award," using data from a poll of over 550,000 Koreans.

The group released their second EP We Can on October 13, featuring the lead single "Zig Zag". On October 15, they had their debut stage for the song on M Countdown. The choreography was distinct for its integration of 10-pound cubes into the dance, which the members pushed around the stage. The song achieved 10 million views on YouTube within 4 days, beating their previous record.

2021: We Play and Play Game: Holiday
The group released their third EP We Play, featuring "After School" as the lead single on March 17.

The group released a single "7Days Tension", in collaboration with South Korean eyewear brand Davich, on May 28.

The group released their fourth EP Play Game: Holiday on August 4, featuring "Holiday Party" as the lead single.

2022: Play Game: Awake and Shin Ji-yoon's departure
On February 28, 2022, it was announced that Shin Ji-yoon would be taking a hiatus temporarily due to tension and anxiety.

The group released their first single album Play Game: Awake on March 7, featuring "Ven Para" as the lead single.

On June 1, 2022, it was confirmed that Shin Ji-yoon would be leaving the group due to ongoing anxiety, and that Weeekly would be continuing as a six-member group.

Endorsement
On May 11, 2021, Weeekly was selected as the advertising models for Korean eyewear brand Davich Optical Chain's Tension 7-Day Lens contact lenses. In August, Lee Soo-jin was selected as the ambassador for the 23rd Bucheon International Animation Festival (BIAF2021) that was held from October 22 to 26.

In August 2022, Weeekly collaborated with AliMoli Studio for an XR Animation Game 'Astrostation' that is planned for release. 'Astrostation' is a 3D VR animation game with the theme of 'Space Exploration'. The project revolves around the theme of 'collaboration' between the Korean Wave Industry and Media Content Companies that allowing them to promote contents with idea and marketing support, and can expect various concepts and genre expansions. They have appeared in the CAST Park  Festival at Gwanghwamun, on October 23rd to introduce the product to domestic consumers.

Members
 Lee Soo-jin (이수진) – leader
 Monday (먼데이)
 Park So-eun (박소은)
 Lee Jae-hee (이재희)
 Jihan (지한)
 Zoa (조아)

Past members
 Shin Ji-yoon (신지윤)

Timeline

Discography

Extended plays

Single albums

Singles

Collaborations

Soundtrack appearances

Compilation appearances

Other releases

Filmography

Television show

Television series

Web series

Web show

Videography

Music videos

Concerts

Pre-debut concerts
 Favegirls 1st Pre-show <We?> (2018)
 Favegirls Pre-show <We?>: Our Christmas (2018) 
 Favegirls Pre-show <We?>: Our New Days! (2019)

Concert participation
 KCON:TACT 4U (2021)
 KCON:TACT HI 5 (2021)
 2021 Asia Song Festival (2021)
 The 28th 2022 Dream Concert (2022)
 HallyuPopFest London 2022 (2022)

Awards and nominations

Listicles

Notes

References

South Korean girl groups
2020 establishments in South Korea
IST Entertainment artists
Musical groups established in 2020
Musical groups from Seoul
K-pop music groups
South Korean dance music groups